Ragú is an American brand of Italian-style sauces and condiments owned, in North America, by Mizkan, and in the United Kingdom and Ireland, by Symington's, a private-label food manufacturer.

The sister product to Ragú, known as Raguletto, is produced in Oceania and Finland. Raguletto is sold in Oceania by Simplot and in Finland by GBFoods.

Overview
The Ragú brand was first sold in 1937 and in 2014 was the best selling U.S. brand of pasta sauce. Ragú was acquired by Chesebrough-Pond's which later merged with Unilever, prior to its sale to Mizkan.

The Ragú pasta sauce line consists of smooth Old World Style sauces, Chunky sauces, bold Robusto! sauces, as well as organic and light pasta sauces. While most well known for selling jar packaged pasta sauce, Ragú also purveys a pizza sauce and an Alfredo sauce.

Current advertising highlights the natural ingredients and "full serving of veggies" found in the sauce.  Cooked tomato foods, including Ragú, are highlighted as containing the antioxidant lycopene, which is claimed to be a cancer fighting agent. As of 2015, the advertising campaign refers to the creation of Ragú by Assunta Cantisano (see below: "History") with the phrase "Simmered in Tradition."

Spelling
The brand name Ragú is spelled with an acute accent, while the Italian word ragù (an Italian sauce typically used for dressing pasta) is spelled with a grave accent.

History
Ragú had its origins in Rochester, New York, in 1937. Assunta Cantisano and her husband Giovanni founded the Ragu Packing Company in their home in Rochester, New York, in 1937, making spaghetti sauce in their basement and selling it on their front porch. They later expanded to an entire factory. In 1969, the Ragu name was sold to Chesebrough-Pond's, which in turn was acquired by Unilever in 1987. Unilever introduced the short-lived Chicken Tonight line of simmering sauces in the early 1990s under the Ragú brand. Mizkan purchased the brand in 2014.

The facility in Rochester still manufactured products under the Cantisano name brand. Some of the original facility still exists and produces products for other labels (including Newman's Own) as private label foods. They also have a facility in Owensboro, KY.

The Cantisano family left to create Cantisano Foods (now LiDestri Foods), and invented the Francesco Rinaldi brand of pasta sauce. The quotations "As I got older, I got better" and "Ciao, Francesco Rinaldi" have gained popularity since their use in commercials for Francesco Rinaldi.

In August 2020, Mizkan announced that they were removing Ragú from the Canadian market.

References

External links
 Official website

Former Unilever brands
Products introduced in 1937
Mizkan brands